Fonds d'Or is a settlement in Guadeloupe, on the island of Grande-Terre. To its north are Guillocheau and Laureal, and Boisvin is to the east.

Populated places in Guadeloupe